The 80th Georgia General Assembly began in Atlanta, Georgia in early 1869. This was the first session after the seat of government was moved from Milledgeville, Georgia following the Georgia Constitution of 1868.  A new capitol building had yet to be built so sessions were held in the opera house on Marietta Street rented from H.I. Kimball.

The new General Assembly contained 153 House members and 44 Senators. It was the first General Assembly in Georgia history to have African-American members. All of the African-American men were temporarily expelled by the General Assembly by September 1868, and were reinstated by Act of Congress in 1870 shortly before the end of the 1870 session. The 80th Assembly was succeeded by the 81st Assembly, in which Democrats won a majority in both chambers and began to pursue harsh recriminations against Republicans in general and African-Americans in particular.

Members of the Georgia State Senate, 1868–1870

Members of the Georgia State House of Representatives, 1868–1870

African-American members 

This was the first time in Georgia that African-Americans, including former slaves, were voted into office in large numbers.

Public education 
The House passed a bill to establish a system of public school system on August 25, 1870 on a 70-29 vote. Bills had been filed by J. E. Bryant of Richmond, J. Mason Rice of Columbia, S. A. Darnell of Pickens, James Ward Porter of Chatham and Tunis Campbell Jr of Mcintosh. It was signed into law on October 13, 1870.

See also

References

Georgia (U.S. state) legislative sessions
1869 in American politics
1869 in Georgia (U.S. state)